Bonviso Bonvisi (1551–1603) was a Roman Catholic cardinal.

Biography
On 21 April 1602, he was consecrated bishop by Pope Clement VIII, with Camillo Borghese, Cardinal-Priest of Santi Giovanni e Paolo al Celio, and Alfonso Visconti, Bishop of Spoleto, serving as co-consecrators.

References

1551 births
1603 deaths
17th-century Italian cardinals
17th-century Italian Roman Catholic archbishops